Erich Probst (5 December 1927 – 16 March 1988) was an Austrian footballer who played as a striker.

International career
Probst made his debut for Austria in a May 1951 friendly match against Scotland and was a participant at the 1954 FIFA World Cup tournament  1954 in Switzerland, where he was one of the foremost strikers. Austria reached third place and Probst ended second in the scorer list with six goals, behind the Hungarian Sandor Kocsis and jointly with Max Morlock of Germany and the Swiss Josef Hügi.

Probst earned 19 caps, scoring 17 goals. His final international was a March 1960 European Championship qualification match against France.

Honours
Austrian Football Bundesliga (4):
 1951, 1952, 1954, 1956
Zentropa Cup (1):
 1951

External links
 Rapid stats - Rapid Archive

References

1927 births
1988 deaths
Footballers from Vienna
Austrian footballers
Austria international footballers
1954 FIFA World Cup players
First Vienna FC players
SK Rapid Wien players
Wuppertaler SV players
FC Zürich players
Expatriate footballers in Germany
Expatriate footballers in Switzerland
Association football forwards